The New Jersey Historical Society is a historical society and museum located in Newark, Essex County, New Jersey, United States. The Historical Society is housed in the former headquarters of the Essex Club. It has two floors of exhibition space, a gift shop, and a hall for lectures.  The NJHS offers occasional Newark walking tours.  The Society formerly published the academic journal, New Jersey History.

Exhibitions can be found on the second and third floor while the library reading room is housed on the fifth floor, formerly the Essex Club squash courts

The Society is open to the public. Members are free, while non-members pay an admission fee.  Patrons visiting the library are encouraged to make an appointment. The current director is Steven Tettamanti.

History
The society was founded in 1845 at Trenton by intellectual and business leaders of New Jersey including Joseph C. Hornblower, Robert Gibbon Johnson, Peter D. Vroom and William Whitehead. In 1846, the society relocated to Newark and has been there ever since.

Its original headquarters in Newark were located on Market Street. In 1931 it left Downtown Newark for a large colonial-style building partially paid for by Louis Bamberger at 230 Broadway, east of Branch Brook Park.

In 1997 the Historical Society returned downtown, to 52 Park Place, on Military Park. The new home is a Georgian style building vacated by the Essex Club that was designed by Guilbert & Betelle.  The building was built in 1926 and had been added to the National Register of Historic Places on February 22, 1991. In its first year in the downtown location visits increased almost fivefold.

See also
Newark Museum
Newark Public Library
National Register of Historic Places listings in Essex County, New Jersey
New Jersey Historical Trust
Jewish Museum of New Jersey
John T. Cunningham

References

External links 

The New Jersey Historical Society
Essex Club –  New Jersey Historic Trust Preservation Bond Program

Culture of Newark, New Jersey
State historical societies of the United States
1845 establishments in New Jersey
History of New Jersey
Organizations based in Newark, New Jersey
History museums in New Jersey
Museums in Newark, New Jersey
Historical societies in New Jersey
National Register of Historic Places in Newark, New Jersey
New Jersey Register of Historic Places